The Democracy Project: A History, a Crisis, a Movement is anthropologist David Graeber's 2013 book-length, inside account of the Occupy Wall Street movement. Graeber evaluates the beginning of the movement, the source of its efficacy, and the reason for its eventual demise. Interspersed is a history of democracy, both direct and indirect, throughout many different times and places. In contrast to many other evaluations of OWS Graeber takes a distinctly positive tone, advocating both for the value of OWS and its methods of Direct democracy. The book was published by Spiegel & Grau.

Another book on Graeber's experiences with Occupy was published in German as Inside Occupy.

References

Further reading

External links 

 
 Interview on C-SPAN

2013 non-fiction books
Books about anarchism
English-language books
Occupy Wall Street
American non-fiction books
Books about democracy
Books by David Graeber
Spiegel & Grau books